Hendrix is a patronymic surname of Dutch and Low German origin, meaning "son of Hendrik". Notable people with the surname include:

 Amanda Hendrix (born 1968), American planetary scientist 
 Arthur Hendrix (1912–1988), American tennis player
 B. G. Hendrix (1922–2020), American politician
 Bakari Hendrix (born 1977), American basketball player
 Brunhilde Hendrix (1938–1995), German sprinter
 Carisa Hendrix, Canadian magician and fire eater
 Carl Hendrix (1906–1977), Arkansas state politician
 Claude Hendrix (1889–1944), American baseball player
 Clay Hendrix (born 1963), American football coach and player
 Clyde Allen Hendrix (1934-2021), American rockabilly singer and songwriter
 David Hendrix (born 1972), American football player
 Dewayne Hendrix (born 1995), American football player
 Dok Hendrix (born 1959), American professional wrestler whose real name is Michael Hayes 
 Don Hendrix (1905–1961), American master optician at Mount Wilson Observatory
 Elaine Hendrix (born 1970), American actress
 Emile Hendrix (born 1955), Dutch show jumping rider
 Eugene Russell Hendrix (1847–1927), American Methodist bishop
 Freman Hendrix (born 1950), American politician
 Friedrich Hendrix (1911–1941), German sprinter
 Gary Hendrix, American software businessman
 Grady Hendrix, American author of Horrorstör
 Harville Hendrix (born 1935), American self-help writer
 Henry J. Hendrix (born 1966), United States Navy officer
 Howard V. Hendrix (born 1959), American writer
 J. C. Hendrix (1926–1963), American stock car racing driver
 James R. Hendrix (1925–2002), American soldier
 James Wesley Hendrix (born 1977), American attorney
 Jan Hendrix (born 1949), Dutch-born Mexican artist and architect
 Jesse Hendrix (born 1982), Canadian football player
 Jimi Hendrix (1942–1970), American guitarist, singer, and songwriter
 Jimmy Hendricks, American murder victim
 John Shannon Hendrix (born 1959), American architectural historian and philosopher
 John W. Hendrix (born 1942), United States Army general
 Jorrit Hendrix (born 1995), Dutch footballer
 Joseph C. Hendrix (1853–1904), member of the United States House of Representatives
 Kimberly Hendrix (1969–2015), American fashion designer
 Leon Hendrix (born 1948), brother of Jimi Hendrix
 Leslie Hendrix (born 1960), American actress
 Manny Hendrix (born 1964), American football player
 Matt Hendrix (born 1981), American golfer
 Michael Hendrix (born c. 1972), American graphic designer and entrepreneur
 Margie Hendrix (1937–1973), American R&B singer
 Neal Hendrix (born 1973), American skateboarder
 Patti Hendrix, soul singer
 Paul F. Hendrix (born 1950s), American ecologist
 Richard Hendrix (born 1986), American basketball player
 Roger W. Hendrix (1943–2017), American microbiologist
 Ryan Hendrix (born 1994), American baseball player
 Taeler Hendrix (born 1989), American professional wrestler
 Terri Hendrix (born 1968), American singer-songwriter
 Wanda Hendrix (1928–1981), American actress
Fictional characters
 Rebecca Hendrix, character from Law & Order: Special Victims Unit

See also 

 Hendric
 Hendrick (surname)
 Hendricks (surname)
 Hendrickx
 Hendrik (given name)
 Hendriks
 Hendrikse
 Hendrikx
 Hendrix (disambiguation)
 Hendryx
 Henrik
 Henry (disambiguation)
 Henryk (disambiguation)

 :Category:Jimi Hendrix

Dutch-language surnames
Low German surnames
Patronymic surnames
Surnames from given names